Liu Yinggu (1897 – 1966) was a KMT general from Zhejiang. He was made a major general on October 16, 1936 and promoted to lieutenant general on June 24, 1938. In September 1939, he was made deputy commander-in-chief of the 19th Army Group. In March 1941, he was made deputy commander-in-chief of the 9th War Area. In December 1941, he was reappointed as deputy commander-in-chief of the 19th Army Group, before being promoted to commander in April 1942.

Bibliography
Pettibone, Charles D. The Organization and Order of Battle of Militaries in World War II.

External links

National Revolutionary Army generals from Zhejiang
1897 births
1966 deaths